Frans-Andries aka François André or Franciscus Andreas Durlet, (11 July 1816 – 2 March 1867) was a Belgian architect, sculptor and printmaker.

Durlet was born and died in Antwerp.  He taught at the Royal Academy of Fine Arts Antwerp and was a founding restorer of its Steen Museum. Pierre Cuypers was one of his students. 
He led the restoration works of the Cathedral of Our Lady in Antwerp and designed its choir stalls. He is considered a patron of Belgium's Gothic Revival architecture. The Durletstraat (Durlet street) in his native city is named in honor of him.

Durlet was married to Jeanne Steveniers (1826–1900). His son Frans (1855–1931) was also an architect, and his grandson Emmanuel became a well-known pianist and composer.

References 

Belgian printmakers
Architects from Antwerp
1816 births
1867 deaths
Royal Academy of Fine Arts (Antwerp) alumni
Academic staff of the Royal Academy of Fine Arts (Antwerp)
19th-century Belgian sculptors
19th-century Belgian male artists
19th-century Belgian architects